Anopheles barianensis is species of mosquito from Anopheles genus, described by James in 1911. According to Catalogue of Life Anopheles barianensis don't have known subspecies.

References 

barianensis
Insects described in 1911